The People's Republic of China and the Republic of Tajikistan have friendly relations characterized by bilateral and multilateral collaboration.

History
The two countries established formal relations on January 4, 1992, shortly after the dissolution of the Soviet Union. As the leader of Tajikistan, now-President Emomali Rahmon first visited Beijing in March 1993.

Economy and trade
The total trade turnover between the two countries in 2012 has reached U.S. $2 billion. China is among the three largest trade partners of Tajikistan. A number of large Chinese enterprises in various industries operate in Tajikistan.

Border dispute

China had a longstanding territorial claim on about 28,430 square kilometers (10.977 square miles) of Tajik territory since 1884, which was taken from the then Qing dynasty by unequal treaties. 

In 2011, as part of a boundary agreement, China officially relinquished its claim on 96% of the total disputed territory, while Tajikistan ceded around 4% - about 1,137 square km (439 square miles) - to China.

International cooperation
Tajikistan and China are active members of regional and international organizations and as a result, they closely cooperate within the frameworks of these organizations, particularly within the framework of the Shanghai Cooperation Organisation.

Because it has a border with China's Muslim Xinjiang province, Tajikistan's political stability is very important to China. China firmly supports Tajikistan's efforts to preserve its national security and stability, and it also helps Tajikistan develop its economy. In 2012, Tajikistan obtained China's promise to provide it with nearly US$1 billion in the form of grants, technical assistance and credits on preferential terms.

The Embassy of the People's Republic of China in Dushanbe has been functioning since March 13, 1992 and the Embassy of the Republic of Tajikistan in Beijing was established on April 7, 1997. The Ambassador Extraordinary and Plenipotentiary of the People's Republic of China to the Republic of Tajikistan is Mr. Fan Syanzhun (since August 2010) and the Ambassador Extraordinary and Plenipotentiary of the Republic of Tajikistan to the People's Republic of China is Mr. Rashid Olimov (since November 2005).

The legal framework of the relationship between the two countries accounts for more than 200 interstate and intergovernmental agreements.

United Nations 
In July 2019, Tajikistan was one of 50 countries that supported China's policies in Xinjiang, signing a joint letter to the UNHRC commending China's "remarkable achievements in the field of human rights", claiming "Now safety and security has returned to Xinjiang and the fundamental human rights of people of all ethnic groups there are safeguarded.

In November 2019, Tajikistan was one of 54 countries that signed a joint statement in which they expressed their support for China's policies in Xinjiang. 

In June 2020, Tajikistan was one of 53 countries that supported the Hong Kong national security law at the United Nations.

Military and security cooperation

The governments of China and Tajikistan collaborate on security and military training; this collaboration has become stronger since the 2001 United States invasion of Afghanistan. The two countries' militaries have conducted joint military exercises since 2006. In 2021 amid security concerns related to the 2021 Taliban offensive, Chinese Minister of Public Security Zhao Kezhi said that the military exercises would improve both countries' counterterrorism efforts.

It is alleged that Chinese troops have been present in Tajikistan since approximately 2016, with the purpose of monitoring access to the Wakhan Corridor. The Minister of Foreign Affairs of the Republic of Tajikistan denied that there are Chinese troops in Tajikistan.

See also
Beyik Pass
China–Tajikistan border
Sarikol Range
Tajiks in China

References

 
Tajikistan
Bilateral relations of Tajikistan